The Guangzhou Loong Lions are a Chinese professional basketball team based in Guangzhou, Guangdong. They play in the Southern Division of the Chinese Basketball Association (CBA).

History
The team was founded in November 2000 as Shaanxi Gaitianli Kylins by the Xi'an Dongsheng Group. In August 2001, they won the "B" league championship, and were promoted to the CBA. In the 2004–05 season, the Shaanxi Kylins finished in fifth place in the North Division, and were out of the playoffs. In 2005–06, they finished sixth, and were once again out of the playoffs. The team was scheduled to participate in the 2008 season of the International Basketball League (IBL). They were replaced by the Shanxi Brave Dragons.

In 2010, the Shaanxi Kylins moved from Xi'an to Foshan, and renamed themselves the Foshan Dralions. The club opted to start rendering its English name as "Long-Lions" rather than "Dralions" before the start of the 2014–15 season.

In 2016, the Foshan Long-Lions moved from Foshan to Guangzhou, and renamed themselves the Guangzhou Long-Lions. In 2017, the Nanhai Long-Lions were founded as the affiliate team. The team competes in the ASEAN Basketball League (ABL).

Players

Current roster

Notable players

 Lorenzo Brown

Games against NBA teams
On 2 October 2017, the team played a pre-season game with the Washington Wizards at the Capital One Arena, which made them the second CBA club to play against the National Basketball Association club.

Honours
Seri Mutiara Cup 2016 Champion

Seri Mutiara Cup 2017 (6th place)

Affiliates
 Macau Black Bears

References

External links
 Official website

 
Chinese Basketball Association teams
International Basketball League teams
Sport in Guangzhou
Basketball teams established in 2000
2000 establishments in China
Foshan
Nenking Group